Vladyslav Viktorovych Lupashko (born 4 December 1986) is a Ukrainian retired professional footballer.

Career
Lupashko is a product of the UFK Dnipropetrovsk youth sportive school and played in his career in the different Ukrainian clubs.

In September 2013 he signed a contract with Illichivets Mariupol.

References

External links
 
 

1986 births
Living people
People from Bilhorod-Dnistrovskyi
Ukrainian footballers
Association football midfielders
Ukrainian Premier League players
Ukrainian First League players
Ukrainian Second League players
FC Borysfen Boryspil players
FC Borysfen-2 Boryspil players
FC Systema-Boreks Borodianka players
FC Metalurh Donetsk players
FC Mariupol players
FC Knyazha Shchaslyve players
FC Lviv players
FC Bukovyna Chernivtsi players
FC Obolon-Brovar Kyiv players
FC Zirka Kropyvnytskyi players
FC Inhulets Petrove players
Sportspeople from Odesa Oblast